Edwin Krishnanandarajah (Tamil:எட்வின் கிருஷ்ணாநந்தராஜா; alias Pradeep Master) is the head of the Tamil Makkal Viduthalai Pulikal's political wing in Sri Lanka.

References
TMVP Leader Castigates US State Department and Opposition Leader for Portraying Them As an Armed Group Asian Tribune - March 14, 2008
Regaining Jaffna Sri Lankan Guardian

Sri Lankan Tamil politicians
Sri Lankan Hindus
Tamil Makkal Viduthalai Pulikal politicians
Living people
Year of birth missing (living people)